Ahetuk is a 2015 Indian Assamese language romantic thriller film directed by Bani Das, veteran Assamese film director and a screenwriter who delivered the Assamese audiences some blockbusters like Maharathi, Mon, Kadambari. His movies are popularly known for an individualistic stamp of visual splendor which is a combine package of romance, action and drama. Ahetuk is another entertainment package, with Gunjan Bhardwaj and Amrita Gogoi in lead role. Actor Tapan Das is also playing an important character in this film. A deep quest for the meaning of those aspects of life which are really meaningless! That's ‘Ahetuk’ for you—a journey in celluloid that tries to depict how we chase our desires in life and often hit a blank wall of nothingness. 
Produced by Raj Kumar Jain this film was released on 2 January 2015.

Plot summary
The story is about two passionate journalists Raj (Gunjan Bhardwaj) and Joyeeta (Amrita Gogoi) who set out to get at the truth of a story to the extent of putting their lives in jeopardy. At the end, surprisingly, they find they have been used by certain vested interests. The step they would take thereafter is something none could fathom. The moral of the story—people or the society must not play with the budding minds or sentiments of Gen X or the younger generation.

Cast
 Gunjan Bhardwaj as Raj
 Amrita Gogoi as Joyeeta
 Tapan Das as Mr Borbora
 Sayan Chakravarty as Rakesh
 Prithiraj Rava as Minister
 Ashwini Bhuyan
 Rajiv Kro as Bailung
 Prastuti Parashar (guest appearance)
 Zubeen Garg (guest appearance)

Soundtrack

The music of the film is composed by Poran Borkatoky (JoJo). The album contains 6 tracks.

References

External links 
 

2015 films
Films set in Assam
2010s Assamese-language films